Apostolepis gaboi, the sand dunes blackhead, is a species of snake in the family Colubridae. It is endemic to Brazil.

References 

gaboi
Reptiles described in 1993
Reptiles of Brazil
Taxa named by Miguel Trefaut Rodrigues